Professione fantasma is an Italian giallo-comedy television series.

Cast
Massimo Lopez: Max Ventura
Edi Angelillo: Lella Baldini
Max von Sydow: The "Afterlife Psychoanalyst"
Bruno Bilotta: Ettore
Marzia Ubaldi: Serena Baldini

See also
List of Italian television series

External links
 

Italian television series
1998 Italian television series debuts
1998 Italian television series endings
Italia 1 original programming